There have been two baronetcies created for persons with the surname Lennard, one in the Baronetage of England and one in the Baronetage of the United Kingdom. Both creations are extinct.

The Lennard Baronetcy, of West Wickham in the County of Kent, was created in the Baronetage of England on 15 August 1642 for Stephen Lennard. The second Baronet sat as Member of Parliament for Winchelsea and Kent. The third Baronet was Member of Parliament for Hythe. The title became extinct on his death in 1727.

The Lennard Baronetcy, of Wickham Court in the County of Kent, was created in the Baronetage of the United Kingdom on 6 May 1880 for Colonel John Lennard. The title became extinct on the death of the third Baronet in 1980.

Lennard baronets, of West Wickham (1642)

Sir Stephen Lennard, 1st Baronet (–1680)
Sir Stephen Lennard, 2nd Baronet (1637–1709)
Sir Samuel Lennard, 3rd Baronet (1672–1727)

Lennard baronets, of Wickham Court (1880)

Sir John Farnaby Lennard, 1st Baronet (1816–1899)
Sir Henry Arthur Hallam Farnaby Lennard, 2nd Baronet (1859–1928)
Sir Stephen Arthur Hallam Farnaby Lennard, 3rd Baronet (1899–1980)

References

Extinct baronetcies in the Baronetage of England
Extinct baronetcies in the Baronetage of the United Kingdom